Sir William Sinclair Marris  (9 October 1873 – 12 December 1945) was a British civil servant, colonial administrator, and classical scholar. He was a member of the Indian Civil Service during the British Raj, and later became Vice-Chancellor of the University of Durham.

Education and life
Born on 9 October 1873, Marris was educated at Wanganui Collegiate School and Canterbury College in New Zealand, and later studied at Christ Church, Oxford. He passed first in the Indian Civil Service (open) examination in 1895.

He married Eleanor Mary Fergusson, in 1905, who died a year later in 1906. After retirement from the Indian Civil Service, Marris returned to Northern England and remarried to Elizabeth Wilford in 1934, whom he had known from his childhood in New Zealand.

In 1921, he laid Murari Chand College's foundation stone in Thackeray Hills, Sylhet alongside Syed Abdul Majid.

Following his return from India he resigned as a member of the Council of the Secretary of India to take a principalship at Armstrong College in Newcastle upon Tyne, and he was Vice-Chancellor of Durham University from 1932 to 1934. During this period, he published translations of Greek and Roman Literature. He retired in 1937 and settled in Cirencester, Gloucestershire, where at Dollar House he died on 12 December 1945.

Indian Civil Service

Sir William Sinclair Marris served in the Indian Civil Service in several positions

 Assistant Magistrate, U.P. 1896
 Under Secretary to Government, U.P. 1899
 Under Secretary to Government of India. 1901
 Deputy Secretary to Government of India, 1904
 Magistrate and Collector; Aligarh, 1910
 Member Executive Committee Coronation Durbar, 1912
 Acting Secretary to Government of India, Home Department, 1913
 Inspector-General of Police, U.P. 1916
 Joint Secretary to Government of India 1919-1921
 Reforms Commissioner, 1919–20
 Governor of Assam, 1921–22
 Governor of the United Provinces of Agra and Oudh, 1922–28
 Member of Council of India, 1928–29

Publications

Sir William Marris authored and translated several publications including
 The Odes of Horace. By Horace, (translated Sir William Marris).  Published London, New York [etc.]: H.Frowde, 1912 (books I-IV and the Saecular hymn translated into English verse)
 The Iliad of Homer. By Homer, (translated Sir William Marris). Published London, New York [etc.]: Oxford University Press, 1934
 The Odyssey of Homer. By Homer, (translated Sir William Marris). Published London, New York [etc.]: Oxford University Press, 1925

 Catullus. By Catallus, (translated Sir William Marris). Published Oxford: Clarendon Press, 1924
 India: the political problem By Sir William Marris. Published Nottingham, 1930?

Vice-Chancellor  of the University of Durham
From 1929 to 1937, Marris was Principal of Armstrong College in the Newcastle division of the University of Durham (now Newcastle University), in which role he held the position of Vice-Chancellor of the University of Durham from 1932 to 1934.

References

External links
 Portrait of Sir William Sinclair Marris from the National Portrait Gallery

1873 births
1945 deaths
People educated at Whanganui Collegiate School
University of Canterbury alumni
Vice-Chancellors and Wardens of Durham University
Indian Civil Service (British India) officers
Governors of Assam
Members of the Council of India
Knights Commander of the Order of the Indian Empire
Knights Commander of the Order of the Star of India
Translators of Homer
British people in colonial India